HMAS Archer (P 86) was an  of the Royal Australian Navy (RAN).

Design and construction

The Attack class was ordered in 1964 to operate in Australian waters as patrol boats, replacing a variety of old patrol, search-and-rescue, and general-purpose craft. The design was developed based on lessons learned from the use of s for patrol duties off Borneo during the Indonesia-Malaysia Confrontation. Initially, nine boats were ordered for the RAN, with another five for Papua New Guinea's Australian-run coastal security force. Subsequently, another six ships were ordered which brought the class to 20 vessels. Propulsion machinery consisted of two 16-cylinder Paxman YJCM diesel engines, which supplied  to the two propellers. The ship's company consisted of three officers and sixteen sailors. Main armament was a bow-mounted Bofors 40 mm gun, supplemented by two .50-calibre M2 Browning machine guns and various small arms. The ships were designed with as many commercial components as possible: the class were to operate in remote regions of Australia and New Guinea, and needed to be able to utilise locally available mechanical components.

Archer was built by Walkers Limited at Maryborough, Queensland, launched on 2 December 1967 and commissioned on 15 May 1968.

Operational history
Archer paid off on 21 October 1974. She was transferred to the Indonesian Navy and renamed Siliman, and was listed in Jane's Fighting Ships as still operational in 2011.

Citations

References

1967 ships
Ships built in Queensland
Attack-class patrol boats